Gilles Simeoni (born 20 April 1967) is a lawyer in France and a politician. He was mayor of Bastia from 2014 to 2016 and has been president of the executive council of Corsica since 2015. Notably, Simeoni served as the Corsican nationalist Yvan Colonna's lawyer at his trial for the assassination of Claude Érignac.

Early life and education
He is the son of Edmond Simeoni and the nephew of Max Simeoni.

He has a masters in law and a doctorate in political science specializing in Mediterranean Politics in the European Union which he received after his studies at the university of Corsica and Aix-en-Provence.

Legal career
He began practicing law on 27 October 1994 and was one of the best known criminal lawyers in Corsica.

He was one of Yvan Colonna's lawyers at his trial for the assassination of Claude Érignac and in 2010 he was listed as one of the thirty most powerful lawyers in France by the magazine GQ6.

After becoming mayor of his home town of Bastia in 2014 he decided to stop practicing law.

Political career

Early years
He was first politically active when he was at university, having been an active member of his student union. The beginning of his political career came in 2001 when Simeoni and the A Mossa Naziunale movement, which he led at that time, supported Marie-Jean Vinciguerra during the Bastia municipal elections.

In 2003 he did work with the Ligue des droits de l'homme.

In 2007 Gilles Simeoni ran to represent Haute-Corse's 2nd constituency. Lozzi, the town that Simeoni's family originally came from, is within this electoral district. In the first round he received just 13.5% of votes (third place) and did not pass on to the second round. Despite this he would later go on to describe this campaign as a tipping point in his life.

2008 municipal elections
A year later, Gilles Simeoni placed second in the first round of the 2008 Bastia municipal elections, having received 14.91% of the vote. This was 5 points more than predicted by voter intention surveys and allowed him to proceed to the second round. In the second round he received 25% of the vote which allowed him to become the leader of the opposition in the municipal council of Bastia.

2010 regional elections and Member of the Corsican Assembly
In the 2010 regional elections, Simeomi and Jean-Christophe Angelini fr were at the top of the nationalist Femu a Corsica party list. The party received 18.4% of the vote in the first round and 25.89% in the second round which won them 11 seat seats in the Corsican Assembly. Because the Radical Party of the Left led by Paul Giacobbi did not have enough seats for an absolute majority, they needed at least some votes from other parties. However, there were deep ideological divisions between the leftists and the nationalists and republicans which prevented most legislation from moving through the Assembly. This did not prevent Giacobbi from bringing issues important to his party to the Assembly floor. This led to the development of a budding rivalry between Simeoni and Giacobbi. Notably Simeoni rebuked Giacobbi calling his behavior in the Assembly a form of electoral clientelism and compared him to the Roman god Janus implying that his governing style was ambivalent.

2012 legislative elections
In the 2012 legislative elections Gilles Simeoni ran to represent Haute-Corse's 1st constituency which contains Bastia and Cap Corse. His primary goal was to gain support for his party ahead of the 2014 municipal elections. Within his district he outperformed predictions by coming in second to the Union for a Popular Movement's Sauveur Gandolfi-Scheit ahead of the Radical Party of the Left's Jean Zuccarelli. On a municipal level, Simeoni's party received around a thousand more votes than they had during the 2010 elections while the Radical Party of the Left saw a decline of around 250. This was a confirmation of the narrowing gap between the two parties and gave credence to the thought of an eventual victory for Simeoni and Pe a Corsica in the 2014 municipal elections.

2014 municipal elections and Mayor of Bastia
In the first round of the March 2014 municipal elections Simeoni's party received 32.32% of the vote. In the second round he picked up votes from the Union for a Popular Movement's Jean-Louis Milani and the Radical Party of the Left's François Tatti, leaving him with 55.40% of the total. The next month on the fifth of April he became the first nationalist mayor of Bastia, ending the dual reign of French Communist Party and the Radical Party of the Left who had been in control of the town since 1968. This outcome was the result of the nationalist's new electoral strategy that Gilles Simeoni had helped to design. This strategy privileged pragmatic alliances so that they could bring their ideas closer to the center of Corsican politics.

2015 municipal elections
During the March 2015 departmental elections, the municipal alliance of Bastia ran pairs of candidates in the four cantons totally or partially within the City of Bastia. They had success in three out of four cantons which further proved that Simeoni's strategy was working. However his ally Fraçois Tatti was seen celebrating the victory of François Orlandi an ally of Paul Giacobbi.

Tatti's actions led Simeoni, Jean-Louis Milani and Emanuelle de Gentili (who was Tatti's former running mate) to call for his resignation. This signaled the beginning of the campaign for the 2015 Regional Elections in which the nationalists hoped to confront Giacobbi.

Personal life
He has three children and describes himself as a non-practicing Catholic.

References

Mayors of Bastia
1967 births
People from Haute-Corse
Corsican nationalists
Living people
Nationalists
Nationalists of European nations
Members of the Corsican Assembly
20th-century French lawyers
21st-century French lawyers
Politicians of the French Fifth Republic